Abu Arish is a city in Jizan Province, in south-western Saudi Arabia. Historically, Abu `Arish produced and exported salt.

See also 

 List of cities and towns in Saudi Arabia
 Regions of Saudi Arabia

References

Populated places in Jizan Province